Giles Bruce Long MBE (born 9 July 1976, Harold Wood, London), is a retired British swimmer, public speaker, TV presenter & commentator.  He is also the inventor of LEXI.

Swimmer
Long's international swimming career highlight was winning gold in the S8 100 m Butterfly in a new world-record time at the Sydney 2000 Paralympics.

The 1994 World Championships was his first major international.  He won gold in the S8 100 m butterfly, breaking the world record in the process. He represented Great Britain at the 1996 Summer Paralympics in Atlanta, and won three medals, including gold in the 100 m butterfly. He competed again at the 2000 Summer Paralympics in Sydney, where he won two gold medals and one silver, and set a new world record in the 100 m butterfly. He also took part in the 2004 Summer Paralympics in Athens, winning bronze in the S8 100 m Butterfly.

In the 2006 New Year Honours, Long was appointed a Member of the Order of the British Empire (MBE) for services to disabled sport.

He announced his retirement from competitive swimming in 2007.

On 5 July 2012 he was a Torchbearer as part of the Olympic Torch Relay. He was the first leg of Day 48 and started on top of Norwich Castle.  He then carried the torch down inside the castle and round the walls before passing the flame on as it travelled towards Ipswich.

Early life
Long grew up in Braintree, Essex in the UK.  He enjoyed being in the water and joined Braintree & Bocking Swimming Club in 1983 aged seven.

At the age of 13 he was diagnosed with an Osteosarcoma, a form of bone cancer, in his right Humerus (the bone which connects shoulder to elbow).  He underwent chemotherapy at University College Hospital, London and had an operation to insert a full humeral prosthetic replacement (a metal bone) into his right arm at the Royal National Orthopaedic Hospital (RNOH), Stanmore.  After the treatment and operation Long resumed swimming and returned to able-bodied competition though by now swimming with just his left arm.

Life returned to relative normality with a return to school but in late 1991 the disease returned with a serious infection during which Long nearly died.  He was admitted to the now demolished Middlesex Hospital, London and was treated, again with chemotherapy, in the UK's first Teenage Cancer Trust unit.  He was operated on by Mr Cannon at the RNOH and then spent six weeks in isolation to treat the infection.  He was then operated on again before finishing his chemotherapy.  The final part of the treatment was a course of Radiotherapy at Middlesex Hospital.

Education
Long read Geology at the University of Leeds and graduated with BSc 2:1 with honours in 1997.

Television & Radio
Giles was part of the UK Channel 4 presenting and commentary team for the London 2012 Paralympics. His contribution was very well received. Clive James in the Daily Telegraph wrote "Giles Long, himself three times a Paralympics swimming gold medallist, who was so thorough in explaining the requirements of swimming with a damaged body that you learned a lot about swimming in general."

On the lead up to the 2012 Paralympics he presented the IPC World Swimming Championships in 2010 (both highlights and live web broadcast), BT Paralympic World Cup live coverage in 2011, the highlights of the IPC European Wheelchair Fencing Championships and packages for That Paralympic Show.

In 2010 and 2011 he worked on the sports desk at Sky News and for the BBC News Channel.

Earlier in his career he had untaken work placements with BBC Radio 1 on the Mark & Lard Show, BBC Radio 5Live, BBC Radio Manchester.

LEXI
Long is the inventor of LEXI a groundbreaking graphics system that, for the first time, effectively explained the confusing system of classification in Paralympic sports on television.  It was first used by London 2012 host broadcaster Channel 4 in the UK.  It was also sub-licensed to ABC for use in Australia.

On 28 November 2012 he was awarded an honorary doctorate by the University of East London for the invention of LEXI and his contribution to the coverage of the London 2012 Paralympic Games.

Lexicon Decoder is the global rights holder for LEXI.

Writer & Author
Giles wrote Changing to Win, an autobiography and motivational book, which was first published by Piatkus (now part of Little, Brown and Company) in October 2008.  It was then reprinted in April 2010.

He wrote briefly for the Daily Telegraph in 2004 describing the emotional roller-coaster of competing at the Athens 2004 Paralympic Games. He also wrote a column in The Swimming Times from May 2008 to July 2009.

Awards
On 12 May 2013 he was part of the Channel 4 team that won at the British Academy of Film and Television Arts award (BAFTA) in the Sport & Best Live Event category.

External links
 Official website

Notes

1976 births
Living people
English male swimmers
Paralympic swimmers of Great Britain
Swimmers at the 1996 Summer Paralympics
Swimmers at the 2000 Summer Paralympics
Swimmers at the 2004 Summer Paralympics
Paralympic gold medalists for Great Britain
Paralympic silver medalists for Great Britain
Paralympic bronze medalists for Great Britain
Medalists at the 1996 Summer Paralympics
Medalists at the 2000 Summer Paralympics
Medalists at the 2004 Summer Paralympics
Paralympic medalists in swimming
Television presenters with disabilities
British male medley swimmers
British male butterfly swimmers
S8-classified Paralympic swimmers
Medalists at the World Para Swimming Championships
Members of the Order of the British Empire